Didier Rous (born 18 September 1970 in Montauban, France) is a French former professional road bicycle racer. He competed in the men's individual road race at the 1996 Summer Olympics.

Biography
He started his professional career with Gan in 1993 before leaving for Festina in 1997, the year in which he won a stage of the Tour de France. In 1998 the Tour and in particular the Festina team were struck by a doping scandal which led to revelations that the team had organised a doping fund under the managemt of Bruno Roussel, the directeur sportif, and the team's doctor, Erik Rykaert. Rous said he had taken the blood enhancer, EPO.

In 2000 he joined a new team, Bonjour, sponsored by a newspaper chain and managed by the former rider Jean-René Bernaudeau. He stayed with Bernaudeau as the team's sponsors changed and ride under its new sponsor, Brioches La Boulangère (2003–2004) and then Bouygues Telecom (2005).

Rous said on 11 June 2007 that he was stopping racing because of health problems and joined the management of the  Bouygues Telecom team.

Major results

1993
 1st, Grand Prix d'Ouverture La Marseillaise
1994
 4th, Overall, Critérium du Dauphiné Libéré
1996
 1st, Stage 4, Volta a la Comunitat Valenciana
 1st, Stage 3 (ITT), Critérium International
 2nd, La Flèche Wallonne
1997
 1st, Stage 18, Tour de France
2000
 1st, Overall, Grand Prix du Midi Libre
 1st, Paris–Camembert
2001
  National Road Race Champion
 Four Days of Dunkirk
 1st, Overall, Stage 5 and 6 (ITT)
 1st, Overall, Tour de Vendée
 1st, Trophée des Grimpeurs
 1st, Prologue, Critérium du Dauphiné Libéré
 11th, Overall, Tour de France
2002
 1st, Overall, Circuit de la Sarthe
 2nd, Overall, Four Days of Dunkirk
2003
  National Road Race Champion
 1st, Trophée des Grimpeurs
 1st, Overall, Tour du Limousin
 2nd, Overall, Four Days of Dunkirk
2004
 1st, GP Ouest-France
 1st, Stage 3, Four Days of Dunkirk
2005
 1st, Stage 3 (ITT), Route du Sud
2006
 Paris–Corrèze
 1st, Overall, Points Competitions and Stage 1
 1st, Trophée des Grimpeurs

See also
 List of doping cases in cycling
List of sportspeople sanctioned for doping offences

References

External links 
Profile at Bouygues Télécom official website 

1970 births
Living people
French male cyclists
French Tour de France stage winners
Doping cases in cycling
Sportspeople from Tarn-et-Garonne
Olympic cyclists of France
Cyclists at the 1996 Summer Olympics
People from Montauban
Cyclists from Occitania (administrative region)